Lukáš Král (born 8 November 1976) is a Czech former ice dancer. With Šárka Vondrková, he is the 1997 Czech national champion. They placed ninth at the 1995 World Junior Championships in Budapest, 15th at the 1996 European Championships in Sofia, and 22nd at the 1996 World Championships in Edmonton.

Programs 
(with Vondrková)

Results 
GP: Champions Series (Grand Prix)

with Vondrková

References 

1976 births
Czech male ice dancers
Living people
Sportspeople from Olomouc